A Dirty Western is a 1975 pornographic Western film directed by Joseph F. Robertson and starring Barbara Bourbon. Along with Russ Meyer's nudie-cutie Wild Gals of the Naked West (1962) and the hardcore Sweet Savage (1979), the film is one of the few porn films in the Western genre.

Cast
 Barbara Bourbon as Sarah
 Richard O'Neal as Nate
 Geoffrey Parker as Sheriff Josh
 Dick Payne as Luke
 Levi Richards as Barney

See also
 List of American films of 1975

References

External links
 

1975 films
American rape and revenge films
1970s English-language films
1970s pornographic films
Pornographic horror films
1970s Western (genre) horror films
American pornographic films
American Western (genre) horror films
1970s American films